Ivan Aleksandrovich Giryov (born 29 June 2000) is a Russian swimmer. 

He participated at the 2019 World Aquatics Championships, winning a medal.

References

2000 births
Living people
Russian male swimmers
Russian male freestyle swimmers
World Aquatics Championships medalists in swimming
European Aquatics Championships medalists in swimming
Swimmers at the 2020 Summer Olympics
Medalists at the 2020 Summer Olympics
Olympic silver medalists in swimming
Olympic silver medalists for the Russian Olympic Committee athletes
Olympic swimmers of Russia
21st-century Russian people